Inkisi may refer to:

 Inkisi (town), a town in the western Democratic Republic of Congo
 Inkisi River, a large south bank tributary of the Congo River